Zigongosaurus (meaning "Zigong lizard") is a genus of sauropod dinosaur from the Middle Jurassic-Late Jurassic-age Shaximiao Formation of Zigong, Sichuan, China. Because of incomplete knowledge of Jurassic Chinese sauropods, it has been hard to interpret, with some sources assigning it to Omeisaurus, some to Mamenchisaurus, and some to its own genus.

History and taxonomy
The genus was based on CV 02501, a specimen including a partial mandible, maxilla, and basioccipital (a bone from the braincase region). Additional bones from all areas of the skeleton, belonging to multiple individuals, were also described and assigned to the new genus. The authors thought it resembled Omeisaurus, but was distinct based on vertebral details. Early accounts in the popular press suggested it was a brachiosaurid.

Chinese sauropod taxonomy became increasingly convoluted in the 1980s.  In 1983, Dong, Zhou, and Zhang named a species Omeisaurus fuxiensis, which they based on different material than Zigongosaurus fuxiensis, but then suggested that the two were the same animal. Following this, the genus was thought to belong to Omeisaurus, possibly as a synonym of O. junghsiensis. In the mid-1990s, opinion shifted, and the genus was instead assigned, by Zhang and Chen, to Mamenchisaurus. They noted that it came from a stratigraphic level between the usual Omeisaurus and Mamenchisaurus beds in age, but more closely resembled Mamenchisaurus.  In particular, the neural spines of the vertebrae (the part of the vertebra that sticks up, over the passage for the spinal cord) in both genera have distinctive weak bifurcation, or splitting, that is not found in Omeisaurus.  The authors renamed it Mamenchisaurus fuxiensis. This assignment was followed provisionally in the most recent major review of sauropods, but at least one author (Valérie Martin-Rolland) has found it to be a distinct genus.

Paleobiology
Whichever genus it turns out to be, as a mamenchisaur- or omeisaur-like sauropod it would have been a large, quadrupedal herbivore with a long neck. It is regarded as a medium- to large-sized sauropod, with a length of around 15 meters (50 feet).

References

Mamenchisaurids
Jurassic dinosaurs of Asia
Fossil taxa described in 1976